The William Clarke Estate is a historic home in Orange Park, Florida. It is located at 1039-1057 Kingsley Avenue. On July 15, 1998, it was added to the U.S. National Register of Historic Places.

References

External links
 Clay County listings at National Register of Historic Places

National Register of Historic Places in Clay County, Florida
Houses on the National Register of Historic Places in Florida
Houses in Clay County, Florida